The Bezhta (or Bezheta) language (Bezhta: бежкьалас миц, bežƛʼalas mic, beƶⱡʼalas mic), also known as Kapucha (from the name of a large village), belongs to the Tsezic group of the North Caucasian language family. It is spoken by about 6,200 people in southern Dagestan, Russia

Bezhta can be divided into three dialects – Bezhta Proper, Tlyadal and Khocharkhotin – which are spoken in various villages in the region. Its closest linguistic relatives are Hunzib and Khwarshi. Bezhta is unwritten, but various attempts have been made to develop an official orthography for the language. The Bezhta people use Avar as the literary language. The first book ever printed in Bezhta was the Gospel of Luke.

Phonology

Bezhta has a rich consonantal and – unlike its relatives Tsez and Avar – a relatively large vowel inventory (18 distinct vowel phonemes), compared to other languages of the same family.

Consonants:

Morphology

Bezhta is mostly agglutinative and the vast amount of locative cases makes its case system particularly rich. The verb morphology is relatively simple. It is an ergative language.

Numerals
Unlike Tsez, Bezhta has a decimal system with the word for twenty being an exception.

 Multiples of 10 higher than 20 are formed by adding the suffix -yig (-йиг) to the multiplier. Hence, the word for 30 is łanayig (лъанайиг).
 Compound numbers are formed by juxtaposition, the smaller numbers following the greater ones. The number 47 is thus expressed as ṏqʼönäyig aƛna (оьнкъоьнаьйиг алIна).

Sample of the Bezhta language
This is a passage taken from the Gospel of Luke written in a Cyrillic orthography based on Avar and Chechen, a Latinized transcription and one in IPA.

References

External links 
 
 The Bezhta People and Language (P.J. Hillery)
 Bezhta Vocabulary List (from the World Loanword Database)
 Bezhta basic lexicon at the Global Lexicostatistical Database

Agglutinative languages
Northeast Caucasian languages
Languages of Russia
Dagestan
Endangered Caucasian languages